The USA Sevens is a rugby sevens tournament held annually during March in the United States. The USA Sevens is the largest annual rugby competition in North America, drawing over 60,000 fans, and is broadcast live in the United States by ESPN. The USA Sevens was introduced in 2004, originally in the Los Angeles suburb of Carson, California. The event moved to San Diego in 2007, and from there moved to Sam Boyd Stadium in Las Vegas in 2010. It then spent the entire decade of the 2010s in Las Vegas before returning to Carson in 2020. The USA Sevens tournament features 16 teams representing countries from every inhabited continent, including the host, the U.S. national team.

The USA Sevens is the fifth of ten tournaments on the World Rugby Sevens Series. The Sevens World Series is played throughout the world at nine other venues: Dubai, South Africa, Australia, New Zealand, Hong Kong, Singapore, Canada, France, and England.

Format
The tournament consists of 16 countries participating in 45 matches over a three-day weekend. The 16 teams are divided into four pools of four teams, with seeding determined by finishes in the previous competition in the Sevens World Series. Wins are worth three points, draws two, and losses one. The top two teams from each group progress to the quarterfinals to compete for the Cup (places 1-4) and Plate (places 5-8). The bottom two teams from each group participate in the Bowl (places 9-12) and Shield (places 13-16) competitions.

Through the 2011–12 edition, the sixteen participating teams were the 12 "core" members of the Sevens World Series circuit, along with 4 additional qualifying teams—other teams that qualified multiple times during the 2009–2012 span included Japan, Canada, Uruguay and Guyana. Starting with the 2012–13 season, the number of core teams increased from 12 to 15, with Canada, Spain and Portugal earning the three new slots.

Popularity and Growth 
The USA Sevens is the 2nd largest annual rugby competition in North America after the Vancouver 7s in Canada The tournament has grown in popularity since the tournament began in 2004.  In recent years, a number of events have accelerated the surge in popularity, including the announcement in 2009 that rugby would return to the Summer Olympics, the general growth of rugby in the United States, the improved performance of the U.S. national rugby team including their success in reaching the semi-finals of the 2009 USA Sevens, and NBC's decision to begin televising the tournament beginning in 2011.

Attendance

Tournament attendance has grown rapidly since its inception in 2004.  The tournament drew 15,800 fans in 2004, 25,000 fans in 2007, 35,773 in 2008, and 37,000 fans in 2009.

The tournament switched to a three-day format in 2011. The 2012 tournament's second-day attendance of 30,112 set a new record for the largest crowd to watch a rugby event in the United States. The 2013 tournament broke attendance records again, with total attendance of 67,341. The 2014 tournament again saw record attendance, with 68,608 fans, despite the fact that the tournament had been moved to January to avoid the 2014 Winter Olympics.

Media coverage
The profile and visibility of the USA Sevens has increased in the United States since NBC began broadcasting the tournament in 2011, marking the first time that the tournament had live television coverage on network TV in the United States. NBC Sports and Universal Sports broadcast eight hours of live coverage of the 2011 tournament, including 4 hours of coverage on NBC.  NBC increased its television coverage for the 2012 tournament, showing 10 hours of live coverage, including 4 hours on NBC and 4 hours on NBC Sports. The 2012 USA Sevens earned strong ratings of 0.7 on NBC, beating other popular sports events that weekend such as the Detroit v. Philadelphia NHL game (0.4) and the Alabama v. LSU basketball game (0.3). NBC again increased its TV coverage in 2013, with 16 hours of coverage across three channels, including 4 hours on NBC and 6 hours on NBC Sports. The 2014 USA Sevens drew ratings of 0.7 on Saturday and 1.0 on Sunday. The 2016 USA Sevens had 7 hours of TV coverage across NBCSN and NBC, but only 1 hour on NBC.

NBC Sports has displayed an increased interest in broadcasting rugby since the International Olympic Committee's announcement in 2009 that rugby would return to the Summer Olympics in 2016. NBC Sports has recognized that its partnership with USA Sevens to broadcast the tournament will help grow the sport of rugby in the United States.

Sponsors
Fueled in part by the publicity generated by the NBC broadcasts and rugby's return to the Olympics, the USA Sevens has been successful in lining up several blue-chip corporate sponsors. For the 2011 tournament, sponsors included Bridgestone, Toyota, Subway and ADT. The tournament was similarly successful in landing commercial sponsors for 2012, including Adidas, Pepsi, DHL, Subway and others.

Effective with the 2010–11 series, the London-based global financial services company HSBC became the title sponsor of the overall IRB Sevens World Series.

History
The USA Sevens tournament has been a part of the World Rugby Sevens Series every year since its 2004 debut.  This makes the USA Sevens tournament one of the longer running consecutive hosts on the circuit.

The USA Sevens debuted at the Home Depot Center, now known as Dignity Health Sports Park, in the Los Angeles suburb of Carson, California in February 2004.  This competition marked the first time the United States ever hosted an official IRB event of international importance.  USA Rugby was awarded the right to host the USA Sevens for three years, in part because rugby was recognized as one of the fastest growing team sports in the U.S.

In 2005, USA Rugby sold a 90% interest in USA Sevens, LLC to United World Sports, LLC, with USA Rugby retaining the remaining 10% ownership interest. In August 2006, USA Rugby and the International Rugby Board renewed the contract for the USA Sevens to remain in the IRB Sevens World Series.

The USA Sevens tournament was held from 2007 to 2009 in San Diego at Petco Park, the home field of the San Diego Padres of Major League Baseball. San Diego was an appealing location because the average high temperature in San Diego in February is a balmy 72 °F (22 °C).

Las Vegas then won the right to host the annual event beginning in 2010, beating out competition from San Francisco, Phoenix, and Orlando. In 2015, World Rugby reached an agreement with USA Rugby and with the tournament's organizers: World Rugby would continue to place the USA Sevens tournament in Las Vegas if the tournament organizers agreed to widen the field at Sam Boyd Stadium and install approved artificial turf.

The USA Sevens was a financial success during its run in Las Vegas, partly because its venue of Sam Boyd Stadium was surrounded by playing fields. This allowed the complex to host the Las Vegas Invitational, a major rugby union event involving club, school, and university teams, alongside the USA Sevens. During the USA Sevens' run in Las Vegas, the entry fee for the Invitational has included tickets to the USA Sevens, providing a large built-in attendance base.

In 2017, the Oakland Raiders were given permission by the NFL to relocate to Las Vegas, with the team to play in a new 60,000-capacity stadium on a plot of derelict land near the Las Vegas Strip. Due to the fact that $750 million of the construction costs was expected to come in the form of public funding, a deal was thrashed out to allow the UNLV Rebels football team of the local University of Nevada, Las Vegas to move in as co-tenants of the new stadium. This meant that Sam Boyd Stadium faces an uncertain future with multiple sources suggesting that it would be demolished. In March 2018, United World Sports CEO Jon Prusmack stated his intention on initiating talks with the Raiders over the next few months to allow the USA Sevens to use the new Raiders stadium for future tournaments. 

In January 2019, The Province, the main newspaper in Vancouver, reported that the then-upcoming 2019 USA Sevens would be the last in Las Vegas, at least for the immediate future. At the time, World Rugby was preparing to announce the hosts for the Sevens Series events for its next four-year cycle, starting with 2019–20 and running through 2022–23. Reasons cited were stadium issues and poor living environment at the team hotels. Possible options were a return to San Diego, or moves to San Francisco (which hosted the 2018 Rugby World Cup Sevens) or Miami. WR ultimately announced that the event would return to its original home of Dignity Health Sports Park for at least the 2020 event.

Apart from the uncertain future of Sam Boyd Stadium, its playing field had been the source of many issues. During the first years of the event's run in Las Vegas, the stadium's standard artificial pitch was used, leading to many safety-related concerns. Some of these concerns were alleviated with the installation of temporary grass surfaces for the 2017–2019 events, but other safety issues inherent to the stadium's design remained. Sam Boyd Stadium was built for American football, a sport with a playing field (including the end zones) that is approximately the same length as a standard rugby pitch but is nearly 20 meters narrower. Because of this, the pitch in Las Vegas was noticeably narrower than at other series stops, with team benches unusually close to the touchlines.

Results

Results by year

Sources: USA Sevens, Rugby7

Results by team
Updated to include the 2022 tournamenent:

Leading scorers

See also
 World Rugby Sevens Series
 Sports in Las Vegas
 USA Women's Sevens
 Rugby union in the United States
 United States national rugby sevens team
 Canada Sevens

References

External links
 Official USA Sevens Homepage

Official IRB homepage for USA Sevens
Index of World Sevens series

 
World Rugby Sevens Series tournaments
International rugby union competitions hosted by the United States
Rugby sevens competitions in the United States
Recurring sporting events established in 2004
2004 establishments in California
Sports competitions in Las Vegas